The 1998/99 season of the Portuguese First Division began on August 21 and ended on May 30. FC Porto became champions for the fifth time in a row.

Promoted teams
These teams were promoted from the Portuguese Second Division of Honour at the start of the season:

UD Leiria (2nd Division of Honour champions)
SC Beira-Mar (2nd placed)
FC Alverca (3rd placed)

Relegated teams
These teams were relegated to the Portuguese Second Division of Honour at the end of the season:

SC Beira-Mar (16th placed)
GD Chaves (17th placed)
A. Académica de Coimbra (18th placed)

Primeira Divisão

Cup
The final of the Cup was surprisingly between two minnows, SC Beira-Mar – who had just been relegated – beating SC Campomaiorense 1–0, after the precocious elimination of all stronger clubs, with FC Porto and S.L. Benfica being eliminated in the round of 32 and Sporting CP in the round of 64.

See also 
 1998–99 Primeira Liga

 
Seasons in Portuguese football
Port
Football
Football